Kaliningrad Devau Airport is a small general aviation airfield and sport airport located  northeast of Kaliningrad. Opened in 1921 as the main airport of Königsberg, it is one of the oldest passenger airports in the world.

History
The airport was built at the site of the former Kalthof proving ground of the Prussian Army on the road from Königsberg to Labiau (present-day Polessk), named after the nearby village of Devau. First flights were conducted here already before World War I. In 1919, per the terms of the Versailles treaty, the "Polish corridor" had separated East Prussia from the main part of Germany. The main building was designed by the architect Hanns Hopp, who was the architect of several public and private buildings erected in Königsberg in the 1920s. The airport gained a tram link to the city, a couple of miles to the south, in 1924.

On 1 May 1922, the flight route from Berlin via Königsberg to Moscow was inaugurated, then the first international air connection of the Soviet Union. The airlink was provided by the joint Soviet-German Deruluft airline. From 1926, Devau Airport was also used by the Deutsche Luft Hansa, which set up the first night flying connection between Königsberg and Berlin as well as air links to Tilsit and Memel (Klaipėda).

After World War II, Devau was discontinued as the main airport by the Soviets, in favor of Khrabrovo Airport. Parts of the original main building still exists and is used by the Kaliningrad Sport Aviation Club. There are Antonov An-2 aircraft parked on the site.

External links
 Website

Airports in Kaliningrad Oblast
Buildings and structures in Kaliningrad
Cultural heritage monuments of regional significance in Kaliningrad Oblast